Paul Adelstein (born April 29, 1969) is an American actor and writer, known for the role of Agent Paul Kellerman in the Fox television series Prison Break and his role as pediatrician Cooper Freedman in the ABC medical drama Private Practice. In addition to supporting roles in films such as Intolerable Cruelty and Memoirs of a Geisha, he is also known for his recurring role as Leo Bergen on ABC's Scandal and as Jake Novak in the Bravo television series Girlfriends' Guide to Divorce. He also played David Sweetzer on the short-lived NBC comedy I Feel Bad.

Adelstein co-created the dark comedy TV series Imposters, which aired on Bravo and ran for two 10-episode seasons from 2017 and 2018; he is credited as a writer on 6 episodes. He also played the role of Shelley Cohen on that show.

Early life
Adelstein was born in Chicago, Illinois, to a Reform Jewish family. Prior to his professional acting career, Adelstein attended the progressive Francis W. Parker School, then Bowdoin College where he graduated Phi Beta Kappa and summa cum laude with a degree in English. He began his career in theatre, working with New Crime Productions, a company founded by John Cusack, and later with the Steppenwolf Theatre Company.

Career
After making his film debut in the film,  The Grifters (1990), Adelstein went on to appear in several television series, including Cupid, ER, Without a Trace, and Scrubs, and to play a number of significant supporting roles in films such as Bedazzled (2000), Intolerable Cruelty (2003), Memoirs of a Geisha (2005), and Be Cool (2005).

In 2005, he received his most significant role to date as a member of the regular cast of the suspenseful television series Prison Break. Although he played the role of mysterious government operative Paul Kellerman, he had originally auditioned for the role of protagonist Lincoln Burrows. When he left the show in 2007, he joined the regular cast of the medical drama Private Practice and stayed for the show's entire six-season run. After the series finale in 2013, he had more recently a recurring role as Leo Bergen on Scandal, which continued into 2018.

He played the main role of Jake Novak, the husband of Abby McCarthy (Lisa Edelstein) in Girlfriends' Guide to Divorce, which premiered in late 2014 as the first scripted original series for Bravo. In April 2016, he was cast as Raymond Blackstone in the Hulu series Chance, starring Hugh Laurie.

Music career

Adelstein is the lead singer and guitarist of a band called Doris. The band was started in the late 1990s, and Adelstein has recorded several albums with them, singing and songwriting for the group. Adelstein is also a pianist and guitarist. His musical background was the cover story in the May/June 2012 issue of Making Music Magazine.

Personal life
Adelstein moved to Los Angeles in 2003, at the age of 34.  Despite hailing from Chicago, Adelstein has been a fan and supporter since childhood of the NFL's Cleveland Browns.

Adelstein married actress Liza Weil in a Reform Jewish ceremony, in November 2006. They had previously known each other through theatrical projects. The two went on to appear together in three film projects: the short film Order Up (2007), the Gregory Dark-helmed Frenemy (2008), and The Missing Person. She also appeared in an episode of Private Practice (airdate February 24, 2011), although she and Adelstein had no scenes together. Weil gave birth to their daughter in April 2010. Weil filed for divorce from Adelstein in March 2016, requesting joint custody of their daughter.

Filmography

Film

Television

References

External links
 
 
 

20th-century American male actors
21st-century American male actors
1969 births
Male actors from Chicago
American male film actors
American Reform Jews
American male television actors
Bowdoin College alumni
Jewish American male actors
Living people
21st-century American Jews
Francis W. Parker School (Chicago) alumni